The Delvic Building is a historic commercial building in Hibbing, Minnesota, United States.  It was constructed in 1922 when Hibbing was a company town for a subsidiary of U.S. Steel, which took the unusual step of designing the commercial as well as residential sectors.  In previous company towns, such as Coleraine, Minnesota, or Gary, Indiana, the controlling industry focused on employee housing and left commercial development to private entrepreneurs.  The Delvic Building was listed on the National Register of Historic Places for its local significance in the themes of commerce, community planning and development, and industry.  It was nominated for exemplifying the type of building constructed in Hibbing's planned downtown, and for attesting to this evolution in corporate control of community development.

When the East Howard Street Commercial Historic District was designated in 1993, the Delvic Building was listed as a contributing property.

See also
 National Register of Historic Places listings in St. Louis County, Minnesota

References

1922 establishments in Minnesota
Buildings and structures in Hibbing, Minnesota
Commercial buildings completed in 1922
Commercial buildings on the National Register of Historic Places in Minnesota
Individually listed contributing properties to historic districts on the National Register in Minnesota
National Register of Historic Places in St. Louis County, Minnesota